The scorpion mud turtle or Tabasco mud turtle (Kinosternon scorpioides) is a species of mud turtle in the family Kinosternidae. It is found in Mexico, Central and South America. It is a medium to large kinosternid (mud turtle) with a domed, oval upper shell 92–270 mm (3.6–10.6 in) long. Males regularly exceed 200 mm. The scorpion mud turtle is a highly aquatic, adaptable kinosternid that will live in almost any body of water. It is primarily omnicarnivorous, a glutton, and feeds on a wide variety of aquatic invertebrates (such as insects and their larvae, spiders, shrimp, crabs, snails and worms) and vertebrates (such as fish and frogs), as well as carrion and bird eggshells. It also feeds on plant material such as algae, fruits, nuts, seeds and aquatic plants. In captivity, poorly fed K. scorpioides can be cannibalistic, biting off the toes and limbs of conspecifics. Females probably lay 1 to 6 hard-shelled eggs. Like many kinosternids, they probably construct a shallow terrestrial nest with little cover.

Subspecies 
Scorpion mud turtle (subspecies) – Kinosternon scorpioides scorpioides (Linnaeus, 1766)
White-throated mud turtle – Kinosternon scorpioides albogulare (Duméril and Bibron, 1870)
Red-cheeked mud turtle – Kinosternon scorpioides cruentatum (Duméril, Bibron & Duméril, 1851)

References

 Linnaeus, 1766 : Systema naturæ per regna tria naturæ, secundum classes, ordines, genera, species, cum characteribus, differentiis, synonymis, locis. Tomus I. Editio duodecima, reformata. Laurentii Salvii, Stockholm, Holmiae, p. 1–532.
 Pritchard, P. C. H. 1979. Encyclopedia of Turtles. T.F.H. Publications, Inc., Neptune, New Jersey. 895 pp.
 Pritchard, P. C. H., and P. Trebbau. 1984. The Turtles of Venezuela. Contributions to Herpetology 2. Society for the Study of Amphibians and Reptiles, Ithaca. 403 pp., 47 plates, 16 maps.

External links
 Kinosternon scorpioides scorpioides

Kinosternon
Turtles of North America
Turtles of South America
Reptiles of Mexico
Reptiles of Central America
Taxa named by Carl Linnaeus
Reptiles described in 1766